Chaudhry Imtiaz Ahmed Ranjha, born in 1958, is a Pakistani politician.

He was born in Mandi Bahauddin in Punjab, the son of Chaudhry Sultan Ahmad. He received his Intermediate from Mandi Bahauddin. He is Senior Vice President of Pakistan Muslim League. He is an agriculturist, and was as a member of District Council in 1983, 1991 and 1993. He was elected to the Provincial Assembly of the Punjab in 1997, and as a Member of the Provincial Assembly (MPA) of the Punjab from PP-101 in 1997 till 1999.

He has served as a Chairman Public Complaint Bureau with former Prime Minister Shaukat Aziz from 2004 to 2007. From May 2012 to March 2013 he has served as a Political Advisor to Prime Minister of Pakistan.

During his tenure as MPA, he has worked for education sector by promoting girls school and colleges in Mandi Bahuddin and provided all resources for the development of schools and colleges. He has also improved and developed the infrastructure of Mandi Bahaudin.Good Man.

References

External links
http://www.pakistanileaders.com.pk/profile/Chaudhry_Imtiaz_Ahmad_Ranjha
http://paktribune.com/news/Govt-will-accelerate-development-activities-in-tribal-areas-Imtiaz-Ranjha-193700.html
http://www.onlinenews.com.pk/details.php?id=76709
http://pap.gov.pk/uploads/previous_members/1997-2001/dist15.htm

Mandi Bahauddin District
Pakistani MNAs 2018–2023
1958 births
Living people